Acrida willemsei is an Asian species of grasshopper in the subfamily Acridinae. The recorded distribution of this species includes southern China, Taiwan, Indo-China, India and Malesia. It was first described in 1954.

References

External links

willemsei
Insects described in 1954
Orthoptera of Asia
Orthoptera of Indo-China